Carmen Twillie may refer to:

 Carmen Twillie Ambar (born 1969), American academic, lawyer, politician
 Carmen Twillie (actress) (born 1950), American studio singer and actress